This is a list of shore-based facilities operated by the Royal Canadian Navy (RCN) from its creation in 1911 until unification into the Canadian Forces on February 1, 1968.

All RCN shore-based facilities in this period followed the naming tradition of the Royal Navy, whereby the prefix HMCS or Naval Radio Station (NRS), was affixed.  This tradition is somewhat maintained under the RCN's successor, Canadian Forces Maritime Command where certain facilities such as HMCS Trinity and NRS Aldergrove, are still formally referred to in this fashion, likely out of tradition, however the entire bases at the deep water ports of Victoria and Halifax are now referred to as a Canadian Forces Base or CFB. For Canadian Forces Bases operated by the modern Royal Canadian Navy see Canadian Forces Bases#Royal Canadian Navy.

Primary deep water ports

British Columbia
 HMC Dockyard Esquimalt
 HMCS Naden

Nova Scotia
 HMC Dockyard Halifax

Naval Air Stations

British Columbia
 
  (Patricia Bay) – West Camp of the former RCAF Patricia Bay was used by the RCN from 1954 to 1968 and by the CF Maritime Command from 1968 to 1974; now part of Victoria International Airport.

Nova Scotia
 RCNAS Shearwater (co-located with RCAF Station Shearwater)

Auxiliary bases and stations

British Columbia
 (closed)
 NRS Aldergrove
 NRS Masset
  – within Esquimalt Naval Base

New Brunswick
  (Coverdale, New Brunswick) – intercept and high-frequency direction-finding station 1944-1971; sold to New Brunswick government and now absorbed into nearby residential community (some areas left abandoned).
  – (Renous, New Brunswick) – ammunition depot 1943-1966; merged with former RCAF Station Chatham and RCAF Station St. Margarets to form CFB Chatham in 1966. The property has been re-purposed for a federal penitentiary named the Atlantic Institution.

Nova Scotia
 
 

 
 
  – former radio station closed and abandoned

Bermuda 
 HMCS Somers Isle
 NRS Bermuda

See also

 List of Naval Reserve divisions for a list of Canadian Forces Naval Reserve facilities, some of which were used by the RCN's reserve.

References